The 2003–2004 Jordan League was the 52nd season of Jordan Premier League, the top-flight league for Jordanian association football clubs. The championship consisted of a preliminary round-robin where 10 teams participated. The top four ranking teams then took part in a championship playoff, which was won by Al-Faisaly.  The bottom four teams took part in a relegation playoff, in which Al-Jazeera and Al-Yarmouk were relegated.

Teams

Map

Preliminary round

Championship playoff

Relegation playoff

References

Jordanian Pro League seasons
Jordan
1